Graves-Stewart House is a historic home located at Clinton, Sampson County, North Carolina.   It was built about 1840, and is a two-story, five bay, double-pile, temple form, Greek Revival style frame dwelling.  The front features a three-bay, one-story hip roofed porch, supported by Doric order pillars.  Also on the property is a contributing carriage house. It is the only surviving structure associated with the Clinton Female Academy.  It was restored and renovated for use by the First American Federal Savings and Loan Association in 1980–1981.

It was added to the National Register of Historic Places in 1983.  It is located in the College Street Historic District.

References

Houses on the National Register of Historic Places in North Carolina
Greek Revival houses in North Carolina
Houses completed in 1840
Houses in Sampson County, North Carolina
National Register of Historic Places in Sampson County, North Carolina
1840 establishments in North Carolina
Historic district contributing properties in North Carolina